Florent Robert Frans Brouw (born 31 January 1929) is a Belgian pianist. He became a Canadian citizen in 1975.

He finished his studies in Brussels' Royal Conservatory in 1952, taking part immediately after in the resumed Queen Elisabeth Music Competition, where he was awarded the 4th prize. An intense concert career ensued throughout the 1950s. Brouw taught in the Ghent Conservatory for a few years before settling in Quebec City in 1964. He is an Honoured Citizen of Veurne.

Brouw is the dedicatee of Jean Absil's Trois Pieces de Piano (pour la main droite seule) Op. 32

References

1929 births
Possibly living people
People from Veurne
Belgian classical pianists
Canadian classical pianists
Male classical pianists
Musicians from Quebec City
Prize-winners of the Queen Elisabeth Competition
21st-century classical pianists
Academic staff of Université Laval
21st-century Canadian male musicians
Belgian emigrants to Canada